The Squeeze may refer to:

 The Squeeze (1977 film), British gangster thriller, directed by Michael Apted
 The Squeeze (1978 film), heist film directed by Antonio Margheriti and starring Lee Van Cleef
 The Squeeze (1987 film), comedy starring Michael Keaton
 The Squeeze (2015 film), drama involving a golfer
 The Squeeze (TV episode), part of Four Star Playhouse shown in 1953, starring Dick Powell, written by Blake Edwards, directed by Robert Aldrich

See also 
 Squeeze (disambiguation)
 The Main Squeeze (disambiguation), band and album